WISEPA J195246.66+724000.8 (designation abbreviated to WISE 1952+7240, or WISE J1952+7240) is a brown dwarf of spectral class T4, located in constellation Draco at approximately 44 light-years from Earth.

Discovery
WISE 1952+7240 was discovered in 2011 by J. Davy Kirkpatrick et al. from data, collected by Wide-field Infrared Survey Explorer (WISE) Earth-orbiting satellite — NASA infrared-wavelength 40 cm (16 in) space telescope, which mission lasted from December 2009 to February 2011. In 2011 Kirkpatrick et al. published a paper in The Astrophysical Journal Supplement, where they presented discovery of 98 new found by WISE brown dwarf systems with components of spectral types M, L, T and Y, among which also was WISE 1952+7240.

Distance
Trigonometric parallax of WISE 1952+7240 is not yet measured. Therefore, there are only distance estimates of this object, obtained by indirect — spectrofotometric — means (see table).

WISE 1952+7240 distance estimates

Non-trigonometric distance estimates are marked in italic.

Notes

References

Brown dwarfs
T-type stars
Draco (constellation)
WISE objects